Athies is a commune in the Somme department in Hauts-de-France in northern France.

See also
Communes of the Somme department
Raymond Couvègnes

References

Communes of Somme (department)
Picardy